Dalbeattie railway station served the town of Dalbeattie, Dumfries and Galloway, Scotland from 1859 to 1965 on the Castle Douglas and Dumfries Railway.

History 
The station opened on 7 November 1859 by the Glasgow and South Western Railway. To the west was the signal box and a siding to the north which served Dalbeattie Creamery.

The goods yard was situated to the south of the line and was equipped with a 7 ton crane, the yard was able to accommodate live stock. The station was host to a LMS caravan in 1935 and 1936 and possibly in 1937.

The station, as well as the signal box and the line, closed on 14 June 1965.

References

External links 
 RAILSCOT - Dalbeattie

Disused railway stations in Dumfries and Galloway
Railway stations in Great Britain opened in 1859
Railway stations in Great Britain closed in 1965
Beeching closures in Scotland
Former Glasgow and South Western Railway stations
1859 establishments in Scotland
1965 disestablishments in Scotland
Dalbeattie